The 1978 Queen's Birthday Honours in New Zealand, celebrating the official birthday of Elizabeth II, were appointments made by the Queen in her right as Queen of New Zealand, on the advice of the New Zealand government, to various orders and honours to reward and highlight good works by New Zealanders. They were announced on 3 June 1978.

The recipients of honours are displayed here as they were styled before their new honour.

Knight Bachelor
 William Glendinning Rodger  – of Auckland. For services to the accountancy profession. 
 James Albert Wicks – of Wellington. For services as a stipendiary magistrate.

Order of Saint Michael and Saint George

Knight Commander (KCMG)
 The Honourable Donald Norman McKay – of Waipu. For public services.

Companion (CMG)
 Frank Richardson Askin – of Wellington. For services as Commissioner of Works (1969–1972) and lately as deputy chairman of the University Grants Committee.
 Cyril John Keppel – of Auckland. For services to the aviation industry, lately as chairman of Air New Zealand Limited.

Order of the British Empire

Knight Commander (KBE)
Civil division
 Hallam Walter Dowling  – of Taradale. For services to local-body and community affairs.

Commander (CBE)
Civil division
 Alexander John Black – of Dunedin. For services to the community and science.
 Dr Eric Mitchell Elder  – of Tuatapere. For services to the community.
 Walter Arnold Hadlee  – of Christchurch. For services to cricket.
 Donald Derek Merritt   – of Nelson. For services to the transport industry and the community.
 Robert Stuart Milne – of Auckland. For services to the City of Auckland.
 Dr Lindsay Russell Wallace  – of Morrinsville; lately director of the Ruakura Agricultural Research Centre, Ministry of Agriculture & Fisheries.
 David Graeme Whyte – of Wellington. For services to the community, especially as president of the New Zealand Red Cross Society.

Military division
 Air Commodore Michael Frank McDonald Palmer – Royal New Zealand Air Force, Defence Headquarters, Wellington.

Officer (OBE)
Civil division
 Austin Graham Bagnall – of Eastbourne. For services to New Zealand literature and the library profession.
 Roger Fairbairn Ballantyne – of Christchurch. For services to the community.
 Ralph John Ballinger  – of Blenheim. For services to horticulture and the community.
 Shirley Morris Bohm – of Upper Hutt; lately director of nursing, Department of Health.
 Albert William Bryant – of Hamilton. For services to music and the community.
 The Reverend Jim Bernard Chambers – of Wellington. For services to the community, especially as chairman of the Congregational Union of New Zealand since 1969.
 Alexander Annis Corban – of Henderson. For services to the viticultural industry.
 Edward Charles Stuart Falconer  – of Dunedin. For services to the community.
 The Very Reverend Edward Frances Farr – of Auckland. For services to the Presbyterian Church.
 Maxwell Rae Grierson – of Auckland. For services to the community.
 John Joseph Loftus – of Lower Hutt; lately deputy secretary of defence, Ministry of Defence.
 James Warwick Fraser Macky – of Auckland. For services to medicine and the community.
 Robert Patrick Magill  – of Napier. For services to the YMCA and community.
 Dennis Raoul Hillel Nathan – of Auckland. For services to the deaf.
 Eric Pearce  – of Nelson. For services to trade-union, educational and local-body affairs.
 Andrew Henri Phillips – of Wellington. For services to the New Zealand Returned Services Association as general secretary.
 Leonard Bingley Southward – of Paraparaumu. For services to the community.
 Francis Gordon Trotman – of Foxton. For services to the New Zealand Civilian Amputees Association and the community.
 Evan Wilfrid Williams – of Auckland. For services to dentistry.

Military division
 Captain Denis Hyland O'Donoghue – Royal New Zealand Navy.
 Colonel Peter Noel Leslie  – Royal New Zealand Army Medical Corps (Territorial Force).
 Group Captain John Dempster Waugh – Royal New Zealand Air Force.

Member (MBE)
Civil division
 Cyril Leslie Allen – of Auckland. For services to the deaf.
 Roy Francis Beadle  – of Greymouth. For services to the trade-union movement.
 Ivan James Berghan – of Ahipara. For services to local-body affairs.
 Patrick Blanchfield   – of Greymouth. For services to the community as the Member of Parliament for West Coast since 1960.
 Edwin Victor Calkin  – of Marton. For services to local-body and community affairs.
 Robert Campbell  – of Rotorua. For services to local-body and community affairs.
 Basil Frederick Ebbett – of Eketāhuna. For services to local-body and farming affairs.
 Iain Watson Gallaway – of Dunedin. For services to rugby and cricket.
 Ian Duncan Gilchrist – of Gore. For services to horticulture.
 Gladys Ivy Goffin – of Napier; brigadier, Salvation Army. For services to the community.
 Arnold Fraser Grant – of Dunedin. For services to paraplegics.
 Dr Cyril Ashley Heaphy – of Nelson. For services to the community.
 Allen Francis Higgs – of Tāneatua. For services to the community.
 Henry James Hargest Horrell  – of Dunedin. For services to the community.
 Gladys Lucy Hudson – of Levin. For services to the community.
 Harold David London  – of Tūrangi. For services to the preservation of local history.
 Kathleen Ellen Joyce McCann – of Tītahi Bay. For services to netball.
 Winifred MacDonald – of Auckland. For services to the preservation of local history.
 Meda-Therese McKenzie – of Wellington. For being the first New Zealand woman to swim Cook Strait and the first person to swim Cook Strait in both directions.
 Terence Power McLean – of Auckland. For services to sporting literature.
 David Erskine Neave  – of Kurow. For services to local-body affairs.
 Winifred Laura O'Halloran – of Gisborne. For services to the Girl Guide movement.
 William Gordon Parker  – of Te Awamutu. For services to farming and the community.
 Patrick Stewart Revell – chief superintendent, New Zealand Police.
 Robert James Skelton – of Auckland. For services to horse racing as a jockey.
 Bertram Oliver Stokes – of Auckland. For services to the Victoria League.
 Sonny Henry White – of Reporoa. For services to agriculture.
 Alma Woods – of Auckland. For services to the theatre and community.

Military division
 Lieutenant (Special Duties) (Band) Donald Carpenter – Royal New Zealand Navy.
 Lieutenant Commander John Trevor Herd – Royal New Zealand Navy.
 Warrant Officer Class II Brian Michael Colbourne – Royal New Zealand Army Ordnance Corps.
 Warrant Officer Class I Ernest Mathew Dix  – Royal New Zealand Electrical and Mechanical Engineers.
 Warrant Officer Class I William David Anthony Hayward – Royal New Zealand Infantry Regiment.
 Captain Paul Tekatene McAndrew – Royal New Zealand Infantry Regiment.
 Squadron Leader Robert Alexander Keown – Royal New Zealand Air Force.
 Warrant Officer Henry Thomas Mitchell – Royal New Zealand Air Force.

British Empire Medal (BEM)
Military division
 Chief Petty Officer Paul Ernest Cherry – Royal New Zealand Navy.
 Marine Engineering Mechanician First Class David Irving Llewellin – Royal New Zealand Navy.
 Petty Officer Weapon Mechanic Leonard Arnold Charles Sears – Royal New Zealand Navy.
 Sergeant Michael Anthony Cunningham – Royal New Zealand Infantry Regiment.
 Sergeant Peter Oliver Ramsay – Royal New Zealand Army Medical Corps.
 Flight Sergeant John Charles Devescovi – Royal New Zealand Air Force.
 Sergeant William John Price – Royal New Zealand Air Force.

Companion of the Queen's Service Order (QSO)

For community service
 Hera Katene Horvath – of Upper Hutt.
 Cyril Stanley Jenkin – of Auckland.
 Albert Henry Marker  – of Christchurch.
 Gwenyth Pearson – of Balclutha.
 Tupinia Te Para Burrows Puriri  – of Paihia.
 Elsie Ward – of Levin; major, Salvation Army.

For public services
 Eric Arthur Batson – of Putorino.
 Malcolm James Conway – of Wellington, lately Director-General of Forests.
 Dr Allan Gordon Cumming – of Palmerston North. 
 Catherine Hamilton Hunter – of Wellington.
 James Gilbert Laurenson  – of Christchurch; lately chief executive, North Canterbury Hospital Board.
 Dr Francis Russell Miller – of Invercargill; mayor of the City of Invercargill.
 Anthony Charles Morcom-Green – of Auckland; chairman of the Children's Health Camps Board. 
 Kuru Waaka – of Rotorua; director, New Zealand Māori Arts and Crafts Institute.

Queen's Service Medal (QSM)

For community service
 Wattie Pukauae Barclay  – of Paihia.
 Irene Ball – of Masterton.
 Gladys Mary Bestic – of Rotorua.
 Ada May Butchers – of Timaru.
 Lindsay Raymond Harrison Clark – of Ōpōtiki.
 Mavis Elizabeth Clayton – of Waitara.
 Annie Doris Coward – of Whangārei.
 Florence Mary Day – of Invercargill.
 Helen McLellan Dykes – of Napier.
 Richard Meddins Evans – of Wellington.
 Ela Hutchison – of Auckland.
 Alfred Charles Kennerley – of Levin.
 Stella Rosalie Kilpatrick – of Auckland.
 Charles Edward King – of Auckland.
 Eleanor Francis King – of Ōhiwa Harbour, Bay of Plenty.
 Zillah Jean Liley  – of Waiheke Island.
 Clarice Maud Lilly – of Christchurch.
 Frederick Hubert McCluskey  – of Wellington.
 Kevin John Marlow  – of Dunedin.
 Keith Robert Mitchell – of Wellington.
 Maera Moke  – of Hamilton.
 Douglas John Moore – of Mount Maunganui.
 Vera Kirihau Morgan – of Wellington.
 The Reverend Cyril Joseph Rutherford Price – of Hamilton.
 Harold Ernest Rance – of Otautau.
 Eva Gladys Richards  – of Wellington.
 Catherine Mary Rush – of Palmerston North.
 Mary Patricia Snaddon – of Ormondville.
 Agnes Edsell Stafford – of Palmerston North.
 Charles Douglas Stewart – of Dunedin.
 Bernice Joyce Thompson – of Christchurch.
 James Leslie Woodhouse  – of Ōhura.

For public services
 Stanley Francis Body  – of Te Aroha.
 Nancy Kathleen Campbell – of Lyttelton.
 Dr Cedric Claude Day – of Auckland.
 Norman Wong Doo – of Auckland.
 The Reverend Rex Charles Ratcliffe Goldsmith – of Tawa; senior prison chaplain, Department of Justice.
 Douglas Haig Goulden – of Southbridge.
 Doris May Graham – of Oamaru.
 Lillian Louisa Henshaw  – of Auckland.
 Norman Henry Lanham  – of Woodville.
 Rex Day Lovell-Smith – of Cheviot.
 Dr Margaret Martin McDowall – of Ngāruawāhia.
 Molly Felton Morrison , of Matapouri.
 Charles Alexander Pilgrim  – of Christchurch.
 Marie Joan Plunkett  – of Dunedin,
 Rhoda Mary Read  – of Morrinsville.
 Adrian Claude Roberts – of Wellington; lately senior advisory officer (personnel), New Zealand Electricity Department.
 George Lionel Gordon Sharp  – of Pukekohe.
 Pehimana Tamati – of New Plymouth.
 Andria Tolich – sergeant, New Zealand Police.
 Theo Wylie – of Tūrangi; chief instructor, Rangipo Prison Farm, Department of Justice.
 Genevieve Mary Irene Young – of Waikanae Beach; senior district nurse (Waikanae), Palmerston North Hospital Board.

Queen's Fire Service Medal (QFSM)
 Alan Ewart Chapman – senior fire safety officer, Timaru Fire Brigade.
 Noel Cecil Glen – divisional officer, Auckland Fire Brigade.
 Thomas Richard Luckie – chief fire officer, Queenstown Volunteer Fire Brigade.

Queen's Police Medal (QPM)
 Robert Andrew Henderson – constable, New Zealand Police.

Air Force Cross (AFC)
 Squadron Leader John Willingham Hewson – Royal New Zealand Air Force.

Queen's Commendation for Valuable Service in the Air
 Squadron Leader Arthur Ross Marbeck – Royal New Zealand Air Force.

References

Birthday Honours
1978 awards
1978 in New Zealand
New Zealand awards